This is a list in alphabetical order of cricketers who have played for Lancashire County Cricket Club in top-class matches since the club was founded in 1864. Lancashire have held first-class status since their inaugural match in 1865. The details are the player's usual name followed by the seasons in which he was active as a Lancashire player. Names of those players who have represented England in Test cricket are preceded by the § symbol. Names of overseas players (i.e., not England-qualified) are preceded by their national team's flag icon (e.g.). The list excludes Second XI and other players who did not play for the club's first team; and players whose first team appearances were in minor matches only.

Many players represented other top-class teams besides Lancashire and some played for the old Manchester Cricket Club before 1864. Eight of those represented a Manchester team styled Lancashire in 1864 before going on to play in first-class matches for the new club from 1865. Players who represented the county before 1865 are included if they also played for the county club but excluded if not. All players known to have represented the county before the formation of the county club are included in List of Manchester Cricket Club players. The list has been updated to the end of the 2021 cricket season using the data published in Playfair Cricket Annual, 2022 edition.

A

B

C

D

E

F

G

H

I

J

K

L

M

N

O

P

R

S

T

U
 James Unsworth (1871)
  Usman Khawaja (2014)

V
  David van der Knaap (1967)
 David Varey (1984–1987)
  Dane Vilas (2017–20210)
  Lou Vincent (2008)

W

Y
  Yasir Arafat (2012)
 Calvert Yates (1882–1885)
 Gary Yates (1989–2003)
 George Yates (1885–1894)

Z
  Zahir Khan (2018)

See also
 List of Lancashire County Cricket Club captains

References

Players

Lancashire
Cricketers